The Men's time trial H2 road cycling event at the 2012 Summer Paralympics took place on September 5 at Brands Hatch. Fourteen riders from eleven different nations competed. The race distance was 16 km.

Results

References

Men's road time trial H2